The following highways are numbered 217:

Canada
 Manitoba Provincial Road 217
 Nova Scotia Route 217
 Prince Edward Island Route 217
 Quebec Route 217

China
 China National Highway 217

Costa Rica
 National Route 217

India
 National Highway 217 (India)

Japan
 Japan National Route 217

United States
 U.S. Route 217 (former)
 Alabama State Route 217
 Arizona State Route 217 (former)
 Arkansas Highway 217
 California State Route 217
 Connecticut Route 217
 Florida State Road 217 (former)
 Georgia State Route 217 (former)
 K-217 (Kansas highway)
Kentucky Route 217
 Maine State Route 217 (former)
 M-217 (Michigan highway)
 Minnesota State Highway 217
 Montana Secondary Highway 217
 New Mexico State Road 217
 New York State Route 217
 North Carolina Highway 217
 Ohio State Route 217
 Oregon Route 217
 Pennsylvania Route 217
 South Carolina Highway 217
 Tennessee State Route 217
 Texas State Highway 217
 Texas State Highway Loop 217
 Utah State Route 217 (former)
 Virginia State Route 217
 Wyoming Highway 217

See also
 217th Street (Manhattan), NYC, NYS, USA; an urban street